Kokey is an ABS-CBN fantaserye which was premiered on Primetime Bida from August 6, 2007, to November 9, 2007. The show is based on the 1997 film with the same title, the planned concept for the show is in continuation to its 10th anniversary of the film, the show lasted for 70 episodes and was followed by Kokey at Ako.

Series overview

Episodes

2007

References

External links

Kokey
2000s television-related lists